Vysotsk is a coastal town and a seaport in Vyborgsky District of Leningrad Oblast, Russia, located on the Karelian Isthmus, on the eastern shore of the Vyborg Bay,  southwest of Vyborg and  northwest of St. Petersburg. It hosts a base of the Russian Baltic Fleet and, since 2004, an oil terminal. Population:  In terms of population, it remains one of the smallest towns in Russia.

History

The Trångsund Fortress (lit. narrow strait) was built by the order of Peter the Great in the beginning of the 18th century after the Tsardom of Russia had captured the area from Sweden during the Great Northern War.
In 1812, Trongzund was included by Alexander I into the newly created Grand Duchy of Finland.

Between 1918 and 1940, the town was part of Viipuri Province of independent Finland under the name Uuras. As a result of the Winter War and subsequent Moscow Peace Treaty, it was occupied by the Soviet Union in 1940 and became a part of Vyborgsky District of the Karelo-Finnish SSR. In 1941, during the Continuation War, it was liberated by Finnish troops and returned to Finland. In June 1944, the town was occupied by the Red Army and was annexed to the Soviet Union according to the Moscow Armistice and Paris Peace Treaty. On November 24, 1944, it was transferred to Leningrad Oblast. In July 1948, the town was renamed Vysotsk in honor of the Soviet machine gunner Kuzma Demidovich Vysotsky, who was killed in the area on March 4, 1940 during the final days of the Winter War.

Vysotsk may be considered one of the cradles of radio, as it was there that Alexander Popov conducted his pioneering experiments in 1897 and 1902.

Administrative and municipal status
Within the framework of administrative divisions, it is incorporated within Vyborgsky District as Vysotskoye Settlement Municipal Formation. As a municipal division, Vysotskoye Settlement Municipal Formation is incorporated within Vyborgsky Municipal District as Vysotskoye Urban Settlement.

Economy
Vysotsk, along with Vyborg and Primorsk, is one of the three most important Russian ports in the Gulf of Finland. All three towns are connected by roads.

There is a railway station in Vysotsk, the end station of a railway line branching off at Popovo railway station; however, there is no passenger service.

References

Notes

Sources

Cities and towns in Leningrad Oblast
Vyborgsky District, Leningrad Oblast
Populated coastal places in Russia
Forts in Russia
Karelian Isthmus
Russian and Soviet Navy bases
Port cities and towns of the Baltic Sea
Finland–Soviet Union relations